García López may refer to:
García López de Cárdenas, Spanish conquistador
Antonio García López (criminal), also known as Toño Bicicleta, notorious Puerto Rican criminal
Antonio López García, Spanish painter
Guillermo García-López, Spanish tennis player
José Luis García-López, Spanish comic book artist
Ricardo García López, known as K-Hito, Spanish caricaturist, film producer, and humorist